Þjórsá is Iceland's longest river at 230 kilometers (about 143 miles). It is in the south of the island.

Þjórsá is a glacier river and has its source on the glacier Hofsjökull. It flows out through narrow gorges in the highlands of Iceland. Further downstream, another river, the Tungnaá, flows into it (see also Háifoss), before it enters the lowlands. There it passes the valley of Þjórsárdalur (Thjorsardalur) where the historical farm of Stöng is located. In the lowlands it flows along the eastern border of the Great Þjórsá Lava.

In the middle of the now rather wide river, there is a big island called Árnes , where there used to be a Þing. The administrative unit of Árnessýsla was named after it.

The hringvegur (Road No.1) traverses the river via a bridge between Selfoss and Hella. Some kilometers to the southwest the river flows into the Atlantic Ocean.

'Á' signifies river while 'þjór' means bull and is cognate to Danish - tyr, Swedish - tjur and Latin - taurus.  According to the Book of Settlement, the river was named after the bovine prow statue of one of the first settlement ships.

See also
 List of rivers of Iceland

References

External links
 

Ramsar sites in Iceland
Rivers of Iceland
Southern Region (Iceland)